Lu Xun Park is a park in Shanghai, where Lu Xun is buried.

Lu Xun Park may also refer to:

Lu Xun Park (Qingdao), park in Qingdao, Shandong, China